Taste You may refer to:

 "Taste You" (Auf der Maur song)
 "Taste You" (Cheyne song)